People who served as the mayor of the Municipality of Petersham are:

References

Mayors Petersham
Petersham, Mayors
Mayors of Petersham